Sondani (सोंधनी), also Sondhni, is a small village at a distance of about 4 km from Mandsaur situated on Mahu-Nimach Highway towards Mahu.

Victory monuments (525 CE)

The spot is famous for a series of monuments with inscriptions, established by Yasodharman (ruled 515 – 545 CE), who praised himself for having defeated the Alchon Hun king Mihirakula.

The victory monuments consist in two pillars, with various other sculptural elements pointing to the existence of a former temple at this spot.

Style
The art and style of the sculptural remains at Sodani are considered as a good marker of the final period of Gupta art, being dated to the reign of Yasodharman (ruled 515 – 545 CE), and more precisely to about 525 CE. After that point and for the next centuries, Indian politics became extremely fragmented, with the territory being divided between smaller dynasties. The art of Sondani is considered as transitional between Gupta art and the art of Medieval India: it represents "an aesthetic which hovered between the classical decorum of Gupta art on the one hand and on the other the medieval canons which subordinated the figure to the larger religious purpose".

References

Villages in Mandsaur district